Ymir was the name of a provincial electoral district in the Canadian province of British Columbia located in the West Kootenay region.  It is named after Ymir, a village east of Trail, B.C. and south of Nelson, B.C.  It made its first appearance on the hustings in the election of 1903 and lasted only until 1912, after which the area was represented by Nelson riding.

For other current and historical electoral districts in the Kootenay region, please see Kootenay (electoral districts).

Demographics

Political geography

Notable elections

Notable MLAs

Electoral history 
Note:  Winners of each election are in bold.

|Liberal
|Alfred Parr 1
|align="right"|323 	
|align="right"|40.07%
|align="right"|
|align="right"|unknown

|Conservative
|Harry Wright
|align="right"|483
|align="right"|59.93%
|align="right"|
|align="right"|unknown
|- bgcolor="white"
!align="right" colspan=3|Total valid votes
!align="right"|806
!align="right"|100.00%
!align="right"|
|- bgcolor="white"
!align="right" colspan=3|Total rejected ballots
!align="right"|
!align="right"|
!align="right"|
|- bgcolor="white"
!align="right" colspan=3|Turnout
!align="right"|%
!align="right"|
!align="right"|
|- bgcolor="white"
!align="right" colspan=7|1 Parr may have been a Labour candidate although Gosnell labels him a Liberal; he may have campaigned as both.
|}

|Independent
|John Houston
|align="right"|147 	
|align="right"|20.68%
|align="right"|
|align="right"|unknown

|Liberal
|John Frederick Hume
|align="right"|239 	
|align="right"|33.61%
|align="right"|
|align="right"|unknown
 
|Conservative
|James Hargrave Schofield
|align="right"|325
|align="right"|45.71%
|align="right"|
|align="right"|unknown
|- bgcolor="white"
!align="right" colspan=3|Total valid votes
!align="right"|711
!align="right"|100.00%
!align="right"|
|- bgcolor="white"
!align="right" colspan=3|Total rejected ballots
!align="right"|
!align="right"|
!align="right"|
|- bgcolor="white"
!align="right" colspan=3|Turnout
!align="right"|%
!align="right"|
!align="right"|
|}	

 
|Conservative
|James Hargrave Schofield
|align="right"|699
|align="right"|65.63%
|align="right"|
|align="right"|unknown
|- bgcolor="white"
!align="right" colspan=3|Total valid votes
!align="right"|1,065
!align="right"|100.00%
!align="right"|
|- bgcolor="white"
!align="right" colspan=3|Total rejected ballots
!align="right"|
!align="right"|
!align="right"|
|- bgcolor="white"
!align="right" colspan=3|Turnout
!align="right"|%
!align="right"|
!align="right"|
|}

 
|Conservative
|James Hargrave Schofield
|align="right"|1,024 	
|align="right"|79.69%
|align="right"|
|align="right"|unknown
|- bgcolor="white"
!align="right" colspan=3|Total valid votes
!align="right"|1,285 	
!align="right"|100.00%
!align="right"|
|- bgcolor="white"
!align="right" colspan=3|Total rejected ballots
!align="right"|
!align="right"|
!align="right"|
|- bgcolor="white"
!align="right" colspan=3|Turnout
!align="right"|%
!align="right"|
!align="right"|
|}

Following the 1912 election most of the area of the Ymir riding was incorporated into the new riding of Nelson.

Sources 
Elections BC Historical Returns

Former provincial electoral districts of British Columbia